Dubai Healthcare City (aka Dubai Health Care City and Healthcare City) is a rapid transit station on the Green Line of the Dubai Metro in Dubai, UAE, serving Dubai Healthcare City.

The station opened as part of the Green Line on 9 September 2011. The Green Line was extended beyond this station to connect Al Jadaf and Creek stations on 1 March 2014.

The station is close to Wafi City, the Wafi Mall, the Khan Murjan Souk, Creek Park, Dubai Children's City, and the Dubai Dolphinarium.

See also
 Wafi City

References

External links
 

Railway stations in the United Arab Emirates opened in 2011
Dubai Metro stations